Liam Cacatian Thomassen (born 10 September 1997), known professionally as Liamoo, is a Swedish singer. In 2016, he won the twelfth season of Swedish Idol series and released his winner's single "Playing with Fire".

Career

2016–2018: Idol and first single

In 2016, Cacatian Thomassen auditioned to take part in the twelfth season of Swedish Idol. During the Qualifying Week he took part in the fourth heat performing the song "Sure Thing", he failed to qualify for the Finals, but went through as a wildcard. He made it through the live shows to the final along with Rebecka Karlsson and Charlie Grönvall. On 9 December 2016 he won the contest. After winning Idol, Cacatian Thomassen released his winner's single "Playing with Fire". The song peaked at number 6 on the Swedish Singles Chart.

2018–present: Melodifestivalen 
Liamoo competed in Melodifestivalen 2018 with the song "Last Breath", and finished in sixth place in the final. He also participated in Melodifestivalen 2019 with the song "Hold You" in a duet with Hanna Ferm. They finished in third place. And he participated in Melodifestivalen 2022 with the song ”Bluffin”, where he finished in fourth place in the final.

Background and early life 
Cacatian Thomassen has roots in Sweden, Norway, Finland and Philippines. He has spoken about being bullied in school and dropping out of school in first year of upper secondary school.

Discography

Singles

As lead artist

As featured artist

Other charted songs

References

Living people
1997 births
Idol (Swedish TV series) winners
People from Gothenburg
21st-century Swedish singers
21st-century Swedish male singers
Swedish people of Filipino descent
Swedish people of Finnish descent
Swedish people of Norwegian descent
Idol (Swedish TV series) participants
Melodifestivalen contestants of 2022
Melodifestivalen contestants of 2019
Melodifestivalen contestants of 2018